Anthony Tratt (born November 3, 1965) is a professional racing car driver who grew up in Sydney, NSW, Australia.

Background
Tratt showed an interest in motorsport from when he was a youngster, at the age of just 10 years, via the Seton family.  He would jump in the truck with Barry Seton, Russell and Mark Skaife and it was that which gave him his “first taste” for the sport.

As he grew older, Tratt was given the opportunity to build a Porsche.  He explains: “Once you’ve raced anything and racing is in your system it’s hard not to do it, so after a while I got bored of just helping out. At the time, a friend of ours was building a Porsche Cup car, so I helped him out. In the end the guy who owned it wasn’t able to race it, so I was asked to have a go. My first race was at Adelaide and we won. They thought that was pretty good, so I was allowed to race again.”

Racing career
Tratt has been racing with Paul Little since the early 1990s when they both raced Porsches.  Towards the end of that decade they had built up an affiliation in which Little ran his own V8 team and Tratt was the driver. Tratt's full-time career in V8 began in 1997 at the Wayne Gardner Racing in the Coke Team. Together with Paul Stokell he drove the second car, with Neil Crompton and Wayne in the lead car.

In 1998 Stokell and Tratt began leasing cars, from which point on they began their own team. During these years Tratt competed against the big teams that had two cars and given that his team was small – composed mostly of volunteers – he was proud to ultimately be only six-tenths off the fastest times.

Tratt's final full-time V8 race was the 2005 Supercars Championship Series at Phillip Island. But he had an accident at the Hayshed.  In 2006 he came back for the endurance races partnering with Tony D’Alberto in the HSV Dealer Team and that race ended with a crash at Reid Park. He also competed in the Carrera Cup, coming in at Number 8.

Career results

Career summary

Complete Bathurst 1000 results

References

Australian Touring Car Championship drivers
Living people
1965 births